The Hualien Sugar Factory is a former sugar refinery in Guangfu Township, Hualien County, Taiwan.

History
The factory was originally established as the Hualien Manufacturing Plant Dahe Factory during the Japanese rule of Taiwan in 1913. During World War II, the factory was heavily damaged by the United States Air Force bombing. After assessment, it was decided that the factory to be restored. After the handover of Taiwan from Japan to the Republic of China in 1945, it was renamed to Hualien Sugar Factory of the Taiwan Sugar Corporation. After full restoration, the sugar production restarted in 1948. The factory finally ceased to operate in 2002.

Transportation
The factory is accessible within walking distance south of Guangfu Station of Taiwan Railways.

See also
 List of tourist attractions in Taiwan

References

1913 establishments in Taiwan
Buildings and structures in Hualien County
Industrial buildings completed in 1913
Sugar refineries in Taiwan
Tourist attractions in Hualien County